Dalgety Bay is a coastal town and parish in Fife, Scotland. The civil parish has a population of 10,777 (in 2011).

The bay was named after the original village of Dalgety, but the ruins of the 12th century St Bridget's Kirk are all that now mark the site. The new town, of which building started in 1965, takes its name from the main bay it adjoins, but the town stretches over many bays and coves including Donibristle Bay and St David's Bay. The root of the place-name Dalgety is the Scottish Gaelic word dealg, 'thorn', and the full name originally meant 'the place of the thorn[-bushes]'.

Dalgety Bay is a commuter town of Edinburgh. While the architecture of the town reflects construction by volume housebuilders, the town is a regular winner of the Best Kept Small Town title.

A series of radioactive objects have been found on the shoreline of Dalgety Bay since the 1990s. The objects come from an eroded landfill that contains debris from Second World War aircraft that originally had radium dials. In 2013, the Scottish Environment Protection Agency found that the Ministry of Defence was solely responsible for the contamination.

Dalgety Bay contains 9 Listed Buildings or structures.

History 
Dalgety Bay began as the village of Dalgety, which was built on the site of the 12th century St Bridget's Kirk. The land surrounding the town was part of the estate owned by the Earls of Moray who built Donibristle House as their residence. In 1592 James Stewart, 2nd Earl of Moray was murdered on the seashore near Donibristle by his rival George Gordon, Earl of Huntly, which is remembered in the popular ballad The Bonnie Earl O' Moray. Towards the end of the 18th century, the village was destroyed by order of the Earls of Moray. and the inhabitants dispersed. During the First World War Morton Gray Stuart, 17th Earl of Moray donated a portion of his land to the Crown, which built an airfield there in 1917 as a base for the Royal Naval Air Service.  The town also sent 30 men into the First World War, with only eight returning unharmed. The Royal Naval Air Service improved and expanded the aerodrome during the Second World War as HMS Merlin, an air station, and constructed an extensive aircraft maintenance facility there.

Construction of the modern town of Dalgety Bay as Scotland's first "enterprise town" began around 1965 on the site of RNAS Donibristle  and much of the remaining ground of the Earls of Moray family seat, Donibristle House. The town stretches across several bays and coves of the northern coast of the Firth of Forth including Donibristle Bay and St David's Bay.

Education
There are two primary schools in Dalgety Bay: Dalgety Bay Primary School and Donibristle Primary School. Dalgety Bay sits within the catchment area for Inverkeithing High School.

Radioactive waste
A series of radioactive objects have been found off the shoreline of Dalgety Bay since the 1990s. One found in 2011 measured 10 MBq. The objects are believed to come from an eroded landfill that contains debris from Second World War aircraft that originally had radium dials. On 25 April 2012, the MoD and the Scottish Environment Protection Agency agreed a joint survey of the problem. Since 1990, more than 2,500 radioactive hotspots have been found on the Dalgety Bay foreshore, one-third of them since September 2011. As of 2012, the Ministry of Defence was conducting a 12-month investigation of the contamination to try to avoid Dalgety Bay "becoming the first place in the UK to be legally designated as radioactive contaminated land". In 2013, SEPA concluded that the MoD was solely responsible for the contamination. In early 2014 the MoD made four proposals regarding how to deal with the contamination, ranging from erecting fences to keep the public out, to sealing it in with concrete.

Twin towns – sister cities

 Ócsa, Hungary

References

External links 
 Dalgety Bay on FifeDirect
 Dalgety Bay and Hillend community website
 A short tour of Dalgety Bay - includes maps and aerial photographs
 Dalgety Bay Weather Station
 Fife Place-name Data :: Dalgety
 Fleet Air Arm archive
 Radioactive contamination

 
Towns in Fife
Parishes in Fife
Populated coastal places in Scotland